Cristina López may refer to:

 Cristina López (racewalker) (born 1982), Salvadoran race walker
 Cristina López (handballer) (born 1975), Spanish handball player
 Cristina López (water polo) (born 1982), Spanish water polo player
 Cristina López (rugby) (born 1976), Spanish rugby player